Andreas Hjartbro Bube (born 13 July 1987) is a Danish track and field athlete competing in the 800 metres. His personal best in that event is 1:44.89, achieved in 2012 in Monaco. Earlier in his career, he used to compete in the 400 metres and 400 metres hurdles.

Bube won a silver medal at the 2012 European Championships in Helsinki at 800 metres event.

Competition record

References

1987 births
Living people
Danish male sprinters
Danish male middle-distance runners
Danish male hurdlers
Athletes (track and field) at the 2012 Summer Olympics
Athletes (track and field) at the 2016 Summer Olympics
Olympic athletes of Denmark
European Athletics Championships medalists
World Athletics Championships athletes for Denmark
People from Gladsaxe Municipality
Sportspeople from the Capital Region of Denmark
21st-century Danish people